The Sentimental Bloke is a 1932 Australian film directed by F. W. Thring and starring Cecil Scott and Ray Fisher. It is an adaptation of the 1915 novel Songs of a Sentimental Bloke by C. J. Dennis, which had previously been filmed in 1919.

Premise
A larrikin is reformed due to the love of a good woman.

Cast 
 Cecil Scott as the Bloke
 Ray Fisher as Doreen
 Tal Ordell as Ginger Mick
Athol Tier as Artie
Edna Morecombe as Effie
Keith Desmond as Uncle
Dora Mostyn as Ma
William Carroll as the Stror at Coot
Leslie Gordon as Erb
Katie Towers
William Ralston
Barney Egan

Production
Dennis was hired to adapt his own story. Dialogue was rewritten by Dennis in prose and updated to the modern era. It placed greater emphasis on supporting characters than the 1919 film, adding a detective plot about Uncle Jim being conned over his discovery of gold in his orchard.

The female lead, Ray Fisher, was signed by Thring to a five-year contract. She later married champion jockey Billy Cook.

Raymond Longford later claimed he worked on the film as an associate. According to Jack Murray, assistant to cinematographer Arthur Higgins, Thing was a director in name only and the real director was Higgins. It was Efftee's most expensive film.

Reception
The film ran for five weeks at a cinema in Melbourne. Thring later estimated the film earned £2,000 at one theatre alone and it was the third most popular Australian movie of the year after On Our Selection and The Squatter's Daughter.

Variety called it 'undoubtedly the best Australian production yet made".</ref>

Thring claimed in the long run he lost £5,000 on the movie due in part because of studio overhead.

The film was released in England but received poor reviews.

See also
Cinema of Australia

References 

Fitzpatrick, Peter, The Two Frank Thrings, Monash University, 2012

External links 

The Sentimental Bloke at Oz Movies

1932 films
Australian black-and-white films
Films directed by F. W. Thring
Films based on Australian novels
Films based on works by Australian writers
1932 romantic comedy films
Australian romantic comedy films
1930s English-language films